Azadkənd (also, Azadkend) is a village and municipality in the Saatly Rayon of Azerbaijan.

Population
It has a population of 1,743.

References 

Populated places in Saatly District